Ben Smaltz (born January 17, 1970) is an American politician who has served in the Indiana House of Representatives from the 52nd district since 2012.

References

1970 births
Living people
Republican Party members of the Indiana House of Representatives
21st-century American politicians